Willis P. Whichard (born May 24, 1940) is an American lawyer and a prominent figure in North Carolina politics and education.  Whichard is the only person in the history of North Carolina who has served in both houses of the state legislature and on both of the state's appellate courts.

Legal and civil service career
Born in Durham, North Carolina in 1940, he began his legal career as a clerk to NC Supreme Court Justice (later Chief Justice) William H. Bobbitt.  From 1966 to 1980, Whichard practiced law in Durham and entered politics, being elected first to the North Carolina House of Representatives and then to the North Carolina Senate.  In 1980, he was appointed by Governor Jim Hunt to the North Carolina Court of Appeals, where he served until he became a justice of the North Carolina Supreme Court in 1986.  Whichard was the justice who, in 1996, denied the appeal of Dontae Sharpe, a man later discovered to be innocent after spending more than 20 years in jail.  Whichard determined there had been "no error" in the original case 

Whichard retired from the Court in 1998 and served as Dean of the Norman Adrian Wiggins School of Law at Campbell University from 1999 until his retirement as Dean in 2006, when he became a partner at the law firm of Moore & Van Allen in its Research Triangle Park office. In September 2013 he joined the firm of Tillman, Whichard & Cagle, PLLC.

A student of North Carolina judicial history, Whichard has written a biography of James Iredell, a North Carolinian who led the state’s Federalists in supporting ratification of the Constitution and was later appointed to the United States Supreme Court by President George Washington.

Education
 Durham City Schools (1958)
 University of North Carolina at Chapel Hill.  A.B in History (1962)
 University of North Carolina at Chapel Hill School of Law.  J.D. (1965)
 University of Virginia. L.L.M. in Judicial Process (1984)
 University of Virginia. S.J.D Doctor of Judicial Science (1994)

Military
 NC Army National Guard. Enlisted man (1966–1972)
 NC National Guard Association.  Life Member

Public service
Judge Whichard has the distinction of being the only person in the history of the State of North Carolina to have served as member of the two bodies of the NC Legislature (House and Senate) and on both of the state's appellate courts (Appeals and Supreme Court).

 NC General Statutes Commission. Member, 1969–1973
 NC House of Representatives. Member, 1970–1974
 NC Senate. Member, 1974–1980
 NC Court of Appeals.  Judge, 1980–1986
 NC Supreme Court.  Associate Justice, 1986–1998

Professional positions
Whichard held a number of other professional positions:

 Law clerk to Associate Justice (later Chief Justice) William H. Bobbitt in the NC Supreme Court (1965–66)
 Attorney in Durham, North Carolina, at the firm Powe, Porter, Alphin & Whichard (1966–1980)
 Adjunct professor of law, University of North Carolina at Chapel Hill (1986–1999)
 Dean and professor of law, Campbell University (1999–2006)

Honors and awards
 UNC: Phi Beta Kappa, Order of the Golden Fleece, Order of the Grail, Order of the Old Well, The Amphoterothen Society, Phi Alpha Theta, NC Law Review Board of Editors, Order of the Coif
 Distinguished Service Award, Durham NC Jaycees (1971)
 Outstanding Youth Service Award, NC Juvenile Correctional Association (1975)
 Outstanding Legislator Award, NC Academy of Trial Lawyers (1975)
 Citizen of the Year award. Eno Valley Civitan Club (1982)
 Hayti Development Corporation Honoree.  (1982)
 Faith Active in Public Life Award. NC Council of Churches (1983)
 Outstanding Appellate Judge Award. NC Academy of Trial Lawyers (1983)
 Durham High School Hall of Fame (1987)
 Leadership Award, NC Alternative Sentencing Association (1988)
 Editor's Quill Award. International Association of Torch Clubs (1990)
 Distinguished Alumnus Award, UNC School of Law (1993)
 Civic Honor Award, Greater Durham Chamber of Commerce (1996)
 Distinguished Alumnus Award, University of North Carolina at Chapel Hill (2000)
 Christopher Crittendon Award, North Carolina Literary and Historical Association (2002)
 Distinguished Service medal, University of North Carolina Alumni Association (2004)

References

External links
 Archived version of Official NC Supreme Court biography
 Campbell University

|-

|-

|-

|-

|-

Justices of the North Carolina Supreme Court
Democratic Party members of the North Carolina House of Representatives
Democratic Party North Carolina state senators
20th-century American judges
21st-century American judges
North Carolina Court of Appeals judges
University of North Carolina School of Law alumni
University of Virginia School of Law alumni
Living people
1940 births